There have been two different classes of minesweepers named Kuha in the Finnish Navy:

Kuha-class minesweeper (1941)
Kuha-class minesweeper (1974)